is a mobile phone game released in 2011 by Namco Bandai Games in Japan only. It is a remake of the arcade game Mappy and features several enemies and mechanics from the original title.

Mobile games
2011 video games
Mappy
Japan-exclusive video games
Video games about mice and rats
Video games about police officers
Video games developed in Japan